Gary J. Famiglietti (November 28, 1913 – July 13, 1986) was a professional American football player who played running back for nine seasons for the Chicago Bears and Boston Yanks. He was born in Medford, Massachusetts and attended college at Boston University. He was drafted in the 3rd round of the 1938 NFL Draft.

Famiglietti's most productive year occurred in 1942. He finished third in the National Football League in rushing yards with a total of 503 and first in rushing touchdowns with a total of 8.

External links 

1913 births
1986 deaths
Sportspeople from Medford, Massachusetts
American football running backs
Boston University Terriers football players
Boston University alumni
Chicago Bears players
Boston Yanks players
Players of American football from Massachusetts